Lederach is an unincorporated community in Lower Salford Township in Montgomery County, Pennsylvania, United States. Lederach is located at the intersection of Pennsylvania Route 113, Salfordville Road/Morris Road, Old Skippack Road, and Cross Road.

References

Unincorporated communities in Montgomery County, Pennsylvania
Unincorporated communities in Pennsylvania